The butterfly genus Cycnus is now synonymized with Panthiades.
In Greek mythology, multiple characters were known as Cycnus (Ancient Greek: Κύκνος) or Cygnus. The literal meaning of the name is "swan", and accordingly most of them ended up being transformed into swans.
 Cycnus, son of Ares.
Cycnus, king of Kolonai.
Cycnus, friend of Phaethon.
Cycnus, son of Apollo.
Cycnus, son of King Ederion (Ancient Greek: Ἐδερίων) or Eredion of Achaea, who, in the 6th century CE account of John Malalas, seduced Leda and made her mother of triplets: the Dioscuri and Helen. In all other sources, she had these children by Zeus who approached her in the shape of a swan (kyknos).

Cycnus, one of the Suitors of Penelope who came from Dulichium along with other 56 wooers. He, with the other suitors, was shot dead by Odysseus with the assistance of Eumaeus, Philoetius, and Telemachus.
Cycnus, a blunder for Guneus in the manuscript of Hyginus' Fab. 97 (list of the Achaean leaders against Troy).

According to Pseudo-Eratosthenes and Hyginus' Poetical Astronomy, the constellation Cygnus was the stellar image of the swan Zeus had transformed into in order to seduce Leda or Nemesis.

Notes

References 

 Antoninus Liberalis, The Metamorphoses of Antoninus Liberalis translated by Francis Celoria (Routledge 1992). Online version at the Topos Text Project.
 Apollodorus, The Library with an English Translation by Sir James George Frazer, F.B.A., F.R.S. in 2 Volumes, Cambridge, MA, Harvard University Press; London, William Heinemann Ltd. 1921. ISBN 0-674-99135-4. Online version at the Perseus Digital Library. Greek text available from the same website.
Gaius Julius Hyginus, Astronomica from The Myths of Hyginus translated and edited by Mary Grant. University of Kansas Publications in Humanistic Studies. Online version at the Topos Text Project.
 Pausanias, Description of Greece with an English Translation by W.H.S. Jones, Litt.D., and H.A. Ormerod, M.A., in 4 Volumes. Cambridge, MA, Harvard University Press; London, William Heinemann Ltd. 1918. . Online version at the Perseus Digital Library
 Pausanias, Graeciae Descriptio. 3 vols. Leipzig, Teubner. 1903.  Greek text available at the Perseus Digital Library.
 Publius Ovidius Naso, Metamorphoses translated by Brookes More (1859-1942). Boston, Cornhill Publishing Co. 1922. Online version at the Perseus Digital Library.
 Publius Ovidius Naso, Metamorphoses. Hugo Magnus. Gotha (Germany). Friedr. Andr. Perthes. 1892. Latin text available at the Perseus Digital Library.
 Strabo, The Geography of Strabo. Edition by H.L. Jones. Cambridge, Mass.: Harvard University Press; London: William Heinemann, Ltd. 1924. Online version at the Perseus Digital Library.
 Strabo, Geographica edited by A. Meineke. Leipzig: Teubner. 1877. Greek text available at the Perseus Digital Library.

External links 

Suitors of Penelope